Jon Steinberg is incoming CEO of international multimedia company Future plc, "one of Europe’s biggest and most successful digital media companies." In early 2016, he founded Cheddar Inc., a new media company covering tech news and culture, and served as its CEO. He is the former President and COO of tech and pop-culture website BuzzFeed.

Early life
Steinberg's mother, Renee, is a teacher at a New York private School and his father, Richard, is a doctor turned real estate broker. He attended the Collegiate School and was interested in computers from an early age. When he was 15 years old, he was accepted into the Walt Disney Imagineering summer intern program. He graduated with an A.B. from the Woodrow Wilson School of Public and International Affairs at Princeton University in 1999 after completing an 122-page-long senior thesis titled "The New American Citizen: The Potential for the Internet to Re-Engage Americans in Civic and Political Life." He also holds an M.B.A. from Columbia University.

Career 
In May 2010, Steinberg joined BuzzFeed while it was still a 15-person company. He played a role in helping develop Buzzfeed's business model, which is rooted in content marketing. Prior to Buzzfeed, Jon was strategic partner development manager on Google’s small medium business partnerships team, executive in residence at Polaris Venture Partners, and founded iBuilding, a commercial real estate software company.

In 2012, Steinberg was named an Ad Age Media Maven. In 2013, he joined the board of Legal Mobile App startup, Shake.

In June of 2014, Jon became Chief Executive Officer of DailyMail.com North America.

Cheddar 
In early 2016, Steinberg founded Cheddar Inc., a new media company covering tech news and culture, and served as its CEO. In September 2016, Cheddar received $10 million in funding from Comcast and other investors.

Cheddar is a live and on-demand video news network, and broadcasts weekdays from the floor of the New York Stock Exchange, NASDAQ Marketsite, and the Flatiron Building. By mid-2016, the company had added a CheddarLife program, and was broadcasting on Facebook Live, Roku and SiriusXM.

In addition to co-hosting the original Cheddar program with business journalist Kristen Scholer, Steinberg sits on the board of Bustle.com and is an advisor to The Skimm and Taboola.

In April of 2019, Altice announced that it was acquiring Cheddar for $200 million. Steinberg stayed on as president of the news division.

Future 
On Feb 22, 2023, Future plc -- publisher of Marie Claire, Cinema Blend, and numerous technology sites including PC Gamer, TechRadar, and Tom's Guide -- announced that longtime CEO Zillah Byng-Thorne would step down on April 3, with Steinberg assuming the role of CEO.

Personal life
 Steinberg has lived in the Upper East Side of New York City with his wife, Jill, and his children, Cooper and Edie.

References

External links 
 
 Cheddar

Year of birth missing (living people)
Living people
Google employees
Columbia Business School alumni
Princeton School of Public and International Affairs alumni
21st-century American businesspeople
American technology chief executives
Collegiate School (New York) alumni